Cholmeley is a surname. Notable people with the surname include:

Cholmeley baronets created for people with the surname Cholmeley, one in the Baronetage of England and one in the Baronetage of the UK
James Cholmeley Russell (1841–1912), barrister, financier, property developer and Welsh railway entrepreneur
Roger Cholmeley (c. 1485 – 1565), Lord Chief Justice of the Court of King's Bench from 1552 to 1553
Sir Cholmeley Dering, 4th Baronet (1679–1711), English politician and duellist
Sir Hugh Cholmeley, 1st Baronet (1600–1657), Member of Parliament (MP) and Royalist leader during the English Civil War
Sir Hugh Cholmeley, 3rd Baronet DL, JP (1839–1904), British soldier and politician
Sir Hugh Cholmeley, 4th Baronet (1632–1689), English politician and baronet
Sir Montague Cholmeley, 1st Baronet (1772–1831), British politician and baronet
Sir Montague Cholmeley, 2nd Baronet (1802–1874), British politician and baronet

See also
Cholmley (disambiguation)
Cholmondeley (disambiguation)